Saturn Return is the fourth studio album by American band the Secret Sisters. It was released on February 28, 2020 under New West Records. It received a nomination for the Grammy Award for Best Folk Album.

Commercial performance
As of March 9, 2020, the album has sold 2,200 copies in the United States.

Critical reception
Saturn Return was met with universal acclaim reviews from critics. At Metacritic, which assigns a weighted average rating out of 100 to reviews from mainstream publications, this release received an average score of 87, based on 5 reviews.

Track listing

Charts

References

2020 albums
The Secret Sisters albums
New West Records albums